Rainer Robert Müller-Hörner (born 27 January 1967 in Fürth) is a retired male triathlete from Germany, who is best known for winning the European title in 1995. Müller-Hörner was a professional athlete from 1984 to 1994. He was awarded the Silbernes Lorbeerblatt, Germany's highest award for sporting achievement, in 2003.

He is married to Yvonne Hörner.

References 
Profile

1967 births
Living people
German male triathletes
Sportspeople from Fürth